Arya Central school, is at Pattom, Thiruvananthapuram, an English Medium school affiliated to the Central Board of Secondary Education. It was founded in 1965 by Sri. Sreekrishnanand Acharya.

References

External links
 CBSE affiliated schools list

Private schools in Thiruvananthapuram